René R. Douglas (born March 3, 1967, in Panama City, Panama) is a former jockey in American Thoroughbred racing. Born into a horse racing family, after attending jockey school Douglas rode in his native Panama for a year and a half before moving to the United States in 1983. His first major win came in 1989 in the prestigious Washington, D.C. International. In 1996, he rode Editor's Note to victory in the Belmont Stakes, the third leg of the U.S. Triple Crown series.

René Douglas won three riding titles at Calder Race Course and Hialeah Park Race Track and a record four in a row from 2001 through 2004 at Arlington Park. He won seven races on a single card at Arlington Park on July 24, 2003, and twice won six on a single card at Calder Race Course.

In the richest win of his career, Rene Douglas captured the 2006 Breeders' Cup Juvenile Fillies aboard Dreaming of Anna.

Competing in the May 23, 2009 Arlington Matron Handicap at Arlington Park, Douglas's horse, Born to Be, clipped heels with the fading pacesetter Boudoir and fell forward and flipped on to her back, crushing Douglas underneath. Jockey Jamie Theriot's horse, Sky Mom, was disqualified by the stewards for causing the accident. Douglas remained pinned under Born to Be and had to be extricated by track personnel. Born to Be was later euthanized and Theriot was suspended for 30 days by the Illinois Racing Board for his role in the accident. The injuries left Rene Douglas paralyzed from the waist down. He uses a wheelchair, and after spinal surgery and a lengthy rehabilitation, he has led an active life since and remains involved in racing as an owner.

Year-end charts

References

1967 births
Living people
American jockeys
Panamanian jockeys
People with paraplegia
Sportspeople from Panama City
Panamanian emigrants to the United States